Pragatisheel Samajwadi Party (Lohia) (translation: Progressive Socialist Party (Lohia)), earlier known as Samajwadi Secular Morcha, was a political party formed by former cabinet minister of Uttar Pradesh Shivpal Singh Yadav after leaving the Samajwadi Party on 29 August 2018. Stating that he has decided to form the Pragatisheel Samajwadi Party (Lohia) to retain socialist values. In the Present scenario the Pragatisheel Samajwadi Party is a registered political  party by the Election Commission. The camp office is located in Lucknow, capital city of Uttar Pradesh. The permanent office is situated in Gomti Nagar, Lucknow.

Election symbol  

The party had been officially assigned the "Key" for its symbol for contesting elections of 2019 which was changed into "Stool" just before elections of 2022. Though PSP president Shivpal Singh Yadav has announced to fight the 2022 assembly election on the bicycle, the symbol of Samajwadi Party.

Notable Leaders 
Shivpal Singh Yadav – MLA, Former Cabinet Minister for P.W.D and Jal Shakti Department, Govt. of Uttar Pradesh

Raghuraj Singh Shakya -Ex MP, Ex MLA

Saiyyada Shadab Fatima – Former Cabinet Minister

Aditya Yadav - Chairman UPPCF and General Secretary, PSP(L)

Party flag

The red colour symbolizes socialism, the yellow colour is the symbol of expectation and the green
colour is the symbol of coordination and prosperity.

In this way, the flag symbolizes expectation achieving physical prosperity by binding the society with socialism.

References

 
Political parties in Uttar Pradesh
Political parties established in 2018
Samajwadi Party
2018 establishments in Uttar Pradesh
Socialist parties in India
Democratic socialist parties in Asia
Janata Parivar